Panovo is a rural locality (a selo) and the administrative center of Pavnovsky Selsoviet, Rebrikhinsky District, Altai Krai, Russia. The population was 926 as of 2013. There are 16 streets.

Geography 
Panovo is located 17 km southwest of Rebrikha (the district's administrative centre) by road. Molodyozhny is the nearest rural locality.

References 

Rural localities in Rebrikhinsky District